Karakalpak may refer to:
 Karakalpaks, a Turkic people 
 Karakalpak language, the language of the Karakalpaks
 Karakalpakstan, an autonomous republic within Uzbekistan
 Chorni Klobuky (Turkic Karakalpak), a group of semi-nomadic Turkic or Turkic-speaking tribes

See also 
 Karapapak, a different Turkic people

Language and nationality disambiguation pages